Akhmed Magomedovich Usmanov (born 16 September 1996) is a Russian freestyle wrestler of Avar heritage.

In 2020, he won the gold medal in the men's 79 kg event at the 2020 Russian National Freestyle Wrestling Championships held in Naro-Fominsk, Moscow Oblast, Russia. In the same year, he won the gold medal in the men's 79 kg event at the 2020 Individual Wrestling World Cup held in Belgrade, Serbia.

He won the silver medal in his event at the 2021 Russian National Freestyle Wrestling Championships held in Ulan-Ude, Buryatia.

Freestyle record 

! colspan="7"| International Senior Freestyle Matches
|-
!  Res.
!  Record
!  Opponent
!  Score
!  Date
!  Event
!  Location
|-
! style=background:white colspan=7 |
|-
|Win
|45–12
|align=left| Amanula Gadzhimagomedov
|style="font-size:88%"|3–1
|style="font-size:88%" rowspan=4|May 27–30, 2021
|style="font-size:88%" rowspan=4|Golden Grand Prix Ivan Yarygin 2021 
|style="text-align:left;font-size:88%;" rowspan=4|
 Krasnoyarsk, Russia
|-
|Win
|44–12
|align=left| Iusup Aidaev
|style="font-size:88%"|5–0
|-
|Win
|43–12
|align=left| Rasul Asluev
|style="font-size:88%"|8–1
|-
|Win
|42–12
|align=left| Marik Shebzukhov
|style="font-size:88%"|10–1
|-
! style=background:white colspan=7 |
|-
|Loss
|41–12
|align=left| Malik Shavaev
|style="font-size:88%"|4–6
|style="font-size:88%" rowspan=5|March 11–14, 2021
|style="font-size:88%" rowspan=5|2021 Russian National Championships 
|style="text-align:left;font-size:88%;" rowspan=5|
 Ulan-Ude, Russia
|-
|Win
|41–11
|align=left| Gadzhi Nabiev
|style="font-size:88%"|6–2
|-
|Win
|40–11
|align=left| Amkhad Tashukhadzhiev
|style="font-size:88%"|8–0
|-
|Win
|39–11
|align=left| Musa Baziev
|style="font-size:88%"|6–0
|-
|Win
|38–11
|align=left| Tazhi Davudov
|style="font-size:88%"|7–0
|-
! style=background:white colspan=7 |
|-
|Win
|37–11
|align=left| Muhammet Nuri Kotanoğlu
|style="font-size:88%"|TF 11–0
|style="font-size:88%" rowspan=4|December 17–18, 2020
|style="font-size:88%" rowspan=4|2020 Individual World Cup 
|style="text-align:left;font-size:88%;" rowspan=4|
 Belgrade, Serbia
|-
|Win
|36–11
|align=left| Gourav Baliyan
|style="font-size:88%"|TF 10–0
|-
|Win
|35–11
|align=left| Magomedkhabib Kadimagomedov
|style="font-size:88%"|4–1
|-
|Win
|34–11
|align=left| Erik Reinbok
|style="font-size:88%"|TF 10–0
|-
! style=background:white colspan=7 |
|-
|Win
|33–11
|align=left| Gadzhimurad Alikhmaev
|style="font-size:88%"|5–2
|style="font-size:88%" rowspan=4|October 16–18, 2020
|style="font-size:88%" rowspan=4|2020 Russian National Championships 
|style="text-align:left;font-size:88%;" rowspan=4|
 Naro-Fominsk, Russia
|-
|Win
|32–11
|align=left| Tazhitin Akayev
|style="font-size:88%"|5–0
|-
|Win
|31–11
|align=left| David Betanov
|style="font-size:88%"|4–1
|-
|Win
|30–11
|align=left| Gadzhi Nabiev
|style="font-size:88%"|6–0
|-
! style=background:white colspan=7 |
|-
|Loss
|29–11
|align=left| Asludin Magomedov
|style="font-size:88%"|3–3
|style="font-size:88%"|January 23–26, 2020
|style="font-size:88%"|Golden Grand Prix Ivan Yarygin 2020 
|style="text-align:left;font-size:88%;"|
 Krasnoyarsk, Russia
|-
! style=background:white colspan=7 |
|-
|Win
|29–10
|align=left| Akhmed Varaev
|style="font-size:88%"|8–1
|style="font-size:88%" rowspan=5|December 7–8, 2019
|style="font-size:88%" rowspan=5|2019 Alans International 
|style="text-align:left;font-size:88%;" rowspan=5|
 Vladikavkaz, Russia
|-
|Loss
|28–10
|align=left| Kakhaber Khubezhty
|style="font-size:88%"|1–9
|-
|Win
|28–9
|align=left| Rustam Magomedov
|style="font-size:88%"|5–1
|-
|Win
|27–9
|align=left| Azret Ulimbashev
|style="font-size:88%"|TF 14–4
|-
|Win
|26–9
|align=left| Aslanbek Gvaramia
|style="font-size:88%"|9–4
|-
! style=background:white colspan=7 |
|-
|Win
|25–9
|align=left| Akhmed Varaev
|style="font-size:88%"|TF 10–0
|style="font-size:88%" rowspan=3|October 24–28, 2019
|style="font-size:88%" rowspan=3|2019 Ugra Cup 
|style="text-align:left;font-size:88%;" rowspan=3|
 Nefteyugansk, Russia
|-
|Loss
|24–9
|align=left| Malik Shavaev
|style="font-size:88%"|0–3
|-
|Win
|24–8
|align=left| Varuzhan Kajoyan
|style="font-size:88%"|7–4
|-
! style=background:white colspan=7 |
|-
|Loss
|23–8
|align=left| Darsam Dzhaparov
|style="font-size:88%"|2–5
|style="font-size:88%" rowspan=5|May 1–3, 2019
|style="font-size:88%" rowspan=5|2019 Ali Aliev Memorial 
|style="text-align:left;font-size:88%;" rowspan=5|
 Kaspiysk, Russia
|-
|Win
|23–7
|align=left| Magomed Kurbanaliev
|style="font-size:88%"|4–1
|-
|Win
|22–7
|align=left| Azamat Nurykau
|style="font-size:88%"|1–1
|-
|Win
|21–7
|align=left| Dibirgadzhiev Magoma
|style="font-size:88%"|5–2
|-
|Win
|20–7
|align=left| Saipulla Alibulatov
|style="font-size:88%"|5–1
|-
! style=background:white colspan=7 |
|-
|Win
|19–7
|align=left| Tamerlan Svelimanov
|style="font-size:88%"|7–3
|style="font-size:88%" rowspan=4|December 7–9, 2018
|style="font-size:88%" rowspan=4|2018 Alans International 
|style="text-align:left;font-size:88%;" rowspan=4|
 Vladikavkaz, Russia
|-
|Loss
|18–7
|align=left| Timur Bizhoev
|style="font-size:88%"|3–3
|-
|Win
|18–6
|align=left| Ertine Mortuy-ool
|style="font-size:88%"|TF 10–0
|-
|Win
|17–6
|align=left| Khetag Tsabolov
|style="font-size:88%"|3–3
|-
! style=background:white colspan=7 |
|-
|Win
|16–6
|align=left| Isamagomed Amiraslanov
|style="font-size:88%"|6–1
|style="font-size:88%" rowspan=4|November 15–19, 2018
|style="font-size:88%" rowspan=4|2018 Intercontinental Cup 
|style="text-align:left;font-size:88%;" rowspan=4|
 Khasavyurt, Russia
|-
|Loss
|15–6
|align=left| Murad Kuramagomedov
|style="font-size:88%"|1–2
|-
|Win
|15–5
|align=left| Amin Tekushev
|style="font-size:88%"|6–5
|-
|Win
|14–5
|align=left| Akhmed Shokumov
|style="font-size:88%"|5–2
|-
! style=background:white colspan=7 |
|-
|Win
|13–5
|align=left| Magomedkhabib Kadimagomedov
|style="font-size:88%"|6–3
|style="font-size:88%" rowspan=4|October 11–14, 2018
|style="font-size:88%" rowspan=4|2018 Ugra Cup 
|style="text-align:left;font-size:88%;" rowspan=4|
 Nefteyugansk, Russia
|-
|Win
|12–5
|align=left| Magomad Dibirgadzhiev
|style="font-size:88%"|7–5
|-
|Win
|11–5
|align=left| Artur Bichenov
|style="font-size:88%"|Fall
|-
|Win
|10–5
|align=left| Adilet Maratbaev
|style="font-size:88%"|Fall
|-
! style=background:white colspan=7 |
|-
|Loss
|9–5
|align=left| Israil Kasumov
|style="font-size:88%"|4–4
|style="font-size:88%" rowspan=3|September 6–8, 2018
|style="font-size:88%" rowspan=3|2018 Dmitry Korkin Memorial 
|style="text-align:left;font-size:88%;" rowspan=3|
 Yakutsk, Russia
|-
|Win
|9–4
|align=left| Artiom Postica
|style="font-size:88%"|TF 10–0
|-
|Loss
|8–4
|align=left| Frank Chamizo
|style="font-size:88%"|4–6
|-
! style=background:white colspan=7 |
|-
|Win
|8–3
|align=left| Magomedrasul Gazimagomedov
|style="font-size:88%"|13–12
|style="font-size:88%" rowspan=5|May 10–14, 2018
|style="font-size:88%" rowspan=5|2018 Ali Aliev Memorial 
|style="text-align:left;font-size:88%;" rowspan=5|
 Kaspiysk, Russia
|-
|Win
|7–3
|align=left| Alan Zaseev
|style="font-size:88%"|TF 11–1
|-
|Win
|6–3
|align=left| Magomad Dibirgadzhiev
|style="font-size:88%"|8–4
|-
|Win
|5–3
|align=left| Isamagomed Amiraslanov
|style="font-size:88%"|Fall
|-
|Win
|4–3
|align=left| Ismail Abdullaev
|style="font-size:88%"|9–2
|-
! style=background:white colspan=7 |
|-
|Loss
|3–3
|align=left| Kamal Malikov
|style="font-size:88%"|7–8
|style="font-size:88%" rowspan=2|July 1–3, 2016
|style="font-size:88%" rowspan=2|2016 Ali Aliev Memorial
|style="text-align:left;font-size:88%;" rowspan=2|
 Makhachkala, Russia
|-
|Loss
|3–2
|align=left| Magomedkhabib Kadimagomedov
|style="font-size:88%"|3–6
|-
! style=background:white colspan=7 |
|-
|Win
|3–1
|align=left| Meyrjan Ashirov
|style="font-size:88%"|7–4
|style="font-size:88%" rowspan=4|October 16–18, 2015
|style="font-size:88%" rowspan=4|2015 Intercontinental Cup
|style="text-align:left;font-size:88%;" rowspan=4|
 Khasavyurt, Russia
|-
|Win
|2–1
|align=left| Magomed Magomedov
|style="font-size:88%"|6–4
|-
|Loss
|1–1
|align=left| Alibekgadzhi Emeev
|style="font-size:88%"|2–4
|-
|Win
|1–0
|align=left| Kurban Alkhasov
|style="font-size:88%"|Fall
|-

References

External links 
 

Living people
1996 births
People from Dagestan
Russian male sport wrestlers
Sportspeople from Dagestan
21st-century Russian people